The 2019 Premier Volleyball League Open Conference is the eight conference of the Premier Volleyball League (35th conference of the former Shakey's V-League). The conference started on August 11, 2019 and ended on November 9, 2019 at the Filoil Flying V Centre, San Juan, Metro Manila, Philippines. Philippine Air Force Women's Volleyball Team returned in action and two new teams joined the conference named Chef's Classics Lady Red Spikers and Choco Mucho Flying Titans (second team of Rebisco).

Teams will play a double-round robin elimination round to determine the final four teams that will advance to the semifinals.

Participating teams

Preliminary round 

 Team standings

|}

Point system:
3 points = win match in 3 or 4 sets
2 points = win match in 5 sets
1 point  = lose match in 5 sets
0 point  = lose match in 3 or 4 sets

Match results
All times are in Philippines Standard Time (UTC+08:00)

|}

Final round 

 All series are best-of-three.

Semifinals 
Rank 1 vs rank 4

|}
Rank 2 vs rank 3

|}

Finals 
3rd place

|}
Championships

|}

Awards

Final standings

Venues 

 Filoil Flying V Centre, San Juan (main venue)
 Malolos Sports and Convention Center, Malolos, Bulacan (PVL on tour)
 Iloilo City (PVL on tour)
 University of St. La Salle Coliseum, Bacolod, Negros Occidental (PVL on tour)

See also 
 2019 Spikers’ Turf Open Conference

References 

2019 in Philippine sport